Frithuswith, commonly Frideswide (c. 65019 October 727), was an English princess and abbess. She is credited as the foundress of a monastery later incorporated into Christ Church, Oxford. She was the daughter of a sub-king of a Mercia named Dida of Eynsham whose lands occupied western Oxfordshire and the upper reaches of the River Thames.

Life

The earliest narrative of the saint's life is the Life of Saint Frideswide preserved in a manuscript from the early twelfth century, copied in the hand of John of Worcester. A longer adaptation of this work is attributed to Robert of Cricklade, head of the Priory of St Frideswide, Oxford. 

The story recounts that Frideswide was born to King Didan and his wife Safrida. She founds a monastery with her father's assistance while still young. Her parents die soon after. Algar, king of Leicester (Æthelbald of Mercia) seeks to marry her in spite of her vow of celibacy. When she refuses him, Algar attempts to abduct her, and Frideswide flees into the wilderness. On fleeing, she finds a ship sent by God which takes her to Bampton, Oxfordshire. Algar searches for her in Oxford, but the people refuse to tell him where she is, and he is struck blind.

Frideswide later seeks greater solitude and migrates to Binsey, Oxfordshire. To avoid having to fetch water from the distant River Thames, she prays to God and a well springs up. The well water has healing properties and many people come to seek it out. A nineteenth-century reconstruction of this well can be found at the Church of Saint Margaret in Binsey. She later returns to Oxford and remains abbess until her death.

Two Middle English adaptations of the Life of Frideswide are included in the South English legendaries. These include several minor variants on the narrative.

The priory

St Frideswide's Priory, a medieval Augustinian house (some of the buildings of which were incorporated into Christ Church, Oxford following the dissolution of the monasteries) is claimed to be the site of her abbey and relics. From early times the abbey appears to have been an important landowner in the area; however, it was destroyed in 1002 during the events of the St. Brice's Day massacre. A shrine was kept at the abbey in Frithuswith's honour; later a monastery was built there for Augustinian canons.

In 1180, the Archbishop of Canterbury Richard of Dover translated Frithuswith's remains to a new shrine in the monastery church, an event that was attended by King Henry II of England.  The later history of the monastery was chequered, but it remained sufficiently prominent that Catherine of Aragon visited the shrine during her final pregnancy.

The priory seal, designed in the late 1180s, depicts Frideswide with a lily and a set of wax tablets.

Henry Chichele, the archbishop of Canterbury, officially declared Frideswide the patron saint of Oxford and the University of Oxford in 1440. Her feast day is 19 October, the traditional day of her death; the date of her translation is commemorated on 12 February; and the invention (discovery) of her relics on 15 May.

The shrine was repeatedly vandalized during the Dissolution of the Monasteries and beyond.  In 1546 the monastery church became (and still remains) the cathedral church for the diocese of Oxford.  Her shrine was reinstated by Queen Mary in 1558, but was later desecrated by James Calfhill, a Calvinist canon of the church, who was intent on suppressing her cult.  As a result, Frithuswith's remains were mixed with those of Catherine Dammartin, wife of Peter Martyr Vermigli, and they remain so to this day.

In modern tradition
Frideswide remains the patron saint of Oxford and its university, and there is a revived tradition of pilgrimages to Christ Church. In later art, she is depicted holding the pastoral staff of an abbess with a fountain springing up near her and an ox at her feet. She appears in medieval stained glass, and in Pre-Raphaelite stained glass by Edward Burne-Jones in Christ Church Cathedral, Oxford, in the chapel where her shrine is also located.

See also

 St Frideswide's Church, Oxford
 Frideswide Square in central Oxford
 Frithuwold of Chertsey, a purported ancestor of Frithuswith
 List of Catholic saints

References

External links

 

650 births
727 deaths
Anglo-Saxon royalty
West Saxon saints
People from Oxford
Christianity in Oxford
Burials at Christ Church Cathedral, Oxford
Anglo-Saxon abbesses
8th-century Christian saints
Christian female saints of the Middle Ages
Female saints of medieval England
7th-century English women
8th-century English women
7th-century English people
8th-century English people
Oxfordshire folklore
English Roman Catholic saints
English Roman Catholics
History of Catholicism in England